Diran is a mountain in the Karakoram range in Nagar Valley  and  Bagrot Valley Gilgit-Baltistan, Pakistan. This  pyramid shaped mountain lies to the east of Rakaposhi (7,788m).

Diran is the most dangerous mountain in Pakistan as its snow is the cause of many events resulting in hundreds of deaths.

Diran was first climbed in 1968 by three Austrians: Rainer Goeschl, Rudolph Pischinger and Hanns Schell. Earlier attempts by a British expedition in 1958, a German expedition in 1959 and an Austrian expedition in 1964 were unsuccessful.

See also
 List of mountains in Pakistan
 List of mountains by elevation

Gallery

References

External links

EverestNews.com Diran page
http://pk.geoview.info/diran_peak_towering_above_bagrot_valley,21296863p

Seven-thousanders of the Karakoram
Mountains of Gilgit-Baltistan